Foreign relations between Austria and Georgia.  Both countries established diplomatic relations in 1992 and Georgia opened its embassy in Vienna in 1996. Austria is represented in Georgia through a non resident ambassador based in Vienna, and through an honorary consulate in Tbilisi. Georgia has an embassy in Vienna and an honorary consulate in Graz.

History

At the end of World War I, Austria-Hungary was, together with the other central powers, the German Empire and the Ottoman Empire, one of the first and only nations that recognized the independence of the short-lived Democratic Republic of Georgia in 1918.  The first ambassador was Georg von und zu Franckenstein.

During the 2008 South Ossetia war, Austrian Foreign Minister Ursula Plassnik urged "Russia to respect the territorial integrity of Georgia, considering the UN resolution." She also said that Russia's military intervention in Georgia had seriously undermined its credibility as a reliable partner of the West.

Bilateral agreements
The following bilateral agreements are in place:
Agreement between Georgia and the Republic of Austria on Bilateral Foreign Economic Relations
Memorandum of Understanding between the Ministry of Internal Affairs of Georgia and the Federal Ministry of Internal Affairs of the Republic Austria
Air Transport Agreement between the Austrian Federal Government and the Government of Georgia
Agreement between the Government of Georgia and the Government of the Republic of Austria for the Promotion and Reciprocal Protection of Investments
Agreement between the Government of Georgia and the Government of the Republic of Austria  for Avoidance of Double Taxation
Protocol on the Amendment to the Air Transport Agreement the Austrian Federal Government and the Government of Georgia

Official visits
The following occurred:
January 19–21, 2006; A visit by Minister of Foreign Affairs of Georgia Gela Bezhuashvili to Vienna for the International Conference on "European Strategies of Development of Democracies in Post Soviet Countries"
February 22–26, 2006; Visit of Speaker of the Parliament of Georgia Nino Burjanadze to Austria
March 26–29, 2006; Working visit of Prime Minister of Georgia Zurab Noghaideli to Austria
May 4–5, 2006; Minister of Internal Affairs of Georgia Ivane Merabishvili to Austria
October 27, 2006; Prime Minister of Georgia, Zurab Noghaideli, to Austria

See also 
 Foreign relations of Austria
 Foreign relations of Georgia
 Georgia–EU relations

References

Bibliography

External links 
  Austrian Foreign Ministry: list of bilateral treaties with Georgia (in German only)
  Georgian Ministry of Foreign Affairs about relations with Austria

 
Georgia 
Bilateral relations of Georgia (country)